The roundtail horned lizard (Phrynosoma modestum) is one of the smaller species of horned lizard. Their specific epithet is from the Latin word modestum, meaning modest or calm. They are found in the United States, in western Texas, New Mexico eastern Arizona, southeastern Colorado and eight states in northcentral Mexico where they are referred to as "tapayaxtin".

Habitat 

Roundtail horned lizards prefer rocky and sandy, semiarid habitat with sparse vegetation, near harvester ant or especially honeypot ant colonies, which is their primary diet.

Description 
The color of roundtail horned lizards usually reflects the color of the soil in their native habitat. Most are uniformly grey in color, but they can also be light brown, or even a pale yellow. Often, darker-colored regions occur around the neck and groin, and sometimes striping on the tail.

They are short, flat, round-bodied lizards with short limbs, and small heads, which have a distinctive crest of nearly equal-length horns. Unlike other horned lizards, they lack a fringe of lateral scales and do not seek to flatten themselves to the ground to eliminate shadow; instead, they hunch their bodies into the shape of a rock for camouflage, boldly casting a shadow.

Their maximum size is 7 cm (2.7 in) snout-to-vent length, and 10.5 cm (4.3 in) total length.

Reproduction 

Roundtail horned lizards are oviparous, breeding and laying eggs in early summer.

References

Bibliography 
Hammerson, Geoffrey A. Amphibians and Reptiles in Colorado. 2nd edition.

External links 

Herps of Texas: Phrynosoma modestum
Desert USA: Horned Lizards
Horned Lizard Conservation Society

Phrynosoma
Reptiles of Mexico
Reptiles of the United States
Fauna of the Southwestern United States
Reptiles described in 1852